Lewiston Historic District may refer to:

Lewiston Historic District (Lewiston, California), listed on the National Register of Historic Places in Trinity County, California
Lewiston Historic District (Lewiston, Idaho), listed on the National Register of Historic Places in Nez Perce County, Idaho

See also
Lewisburg Historic District (disambiguation)